Distributed management is a management method for people to work together over the web to accomplish desired goals.  Management activities are distributed through the people doing the work.

Changed Operating Environment 

Traditionally the functions of management are centralised and performed by managers.  This limits the amount of work that can be done.

The Internet has provided the opportunity for people to work together globally.  However, “manager centric” approaches have been unable to provide a practical means to fully utilize the available connectivity.

Social networking has been tried, but it lacks an underlying management method and the tools to apply the method globally and consistently.

History 

In his Doctorate on Introducing Technology into Organizations completed in 1990, Dr Neil Miller identified the need for a distributed management paradigm.  In 1991, he founded TASKey Pty Ltd to develop, operationalise, and commercialize a new distributed management paradigm.  Patents on the core parts of distributed management were granted in Australia (1997) and USA (2000).

In 1995, TASKey correctly estimated that the web technologies required to globally implement distributed management would not be available for about 15 years.  TASKey has used this time for comprehensive experimentation and to refine TASKey methods and software tools, so they are acceptable and workable for most people with minimal training.

Key Parts 

The key parts of Distributed Management are:
	Each task has stakeholders (called a task team) with one person responsible
	Related tasks are joined through a task tree
	Context, task visibility, security and privacy are based on task team membership
	Team members list the actions/To-Dos required to do a task
	Team members create action teams to do each action
	Web software creates a To-Do list for each person based on action team membership
	Task progress reporting is based on completed actions

Differentiators 

The differentiators between distributed management and traditional management are:
	Designed for the web (not just automating existing manual methods)
	Anyone, anywhere, at any time, can initiate a task
	Handles all tasks concurrently (strategies, operations, governance, projects, personal)
	Automatically keeps tasks and people coordinated globally through teams
	Sorts out global task information and presents it from each user's perspective
	Creates and synchronizes peoples’ To Do lists and Gantt charts
	Controls access to information using patented dynamic security and privacy methods
	Informs users on a need-to-know basis (so people are not overwhelmed)
	Includes specialist software tools for templating, and adjusting complex task, team and To-Do relationships (to match real world situations)

Software Tools 

Implementing the distributed management paradigm required new web software to manage the complex dynamic relationships that need to be managed to get work done.  Over 13 years, TASKey has developed, validated and commercialized web software called TASKey TEAM for enterprise distributed management and Me2Team (a basic version of TASKey TEAM).

TASKey web software is unique in that it automatically tracks and organizes all tasks (for strategies, operations and projects), synchronizes all stakeholders’ personal To Do lists, and automatically reports progress.

Validation 

TASKey software functionality has been developed and validated in a range of workplaces over 13 years.  Case studies demonstrate effective use by both managers and workers.

Management Insights 

Management insights that have been gained during the development, validation and commercialization of Distributed Management are explored in Blog – Articles and Insights

References 

	Neil G. Miller (1990), "A Methodology for Introducing Technology into Organizations", Doctorate Thesis, University of New South Wales, Australia
	USA Patent (2000) No. 6,101,481, Australian Patent (1997) No. 707,550
	Neil G Miller (2004), "Coordinating Many People Doing Many Projects and Tasks", 8th Australian International Performance Management Symposium, Canberra, Australia
	2005 Consensus Software Award Winner for Excellence in Australian and New Zealand Software
	Case Studies

Management by type